Nong Zhuang is a Tai language spoken mainly in Wenshan Prefecture, Yunnan, China. In Wenshan Prefecture, it is spoken in Yanshan, Guangnan, Wenshan, Maguan, Funing, Xichou, and Malipo counties, and also in Honghe Prefecture and Vietnam. The heaviest concentrations relative to other Zhuang groups are in Xichou (96% of the total Zhuang population) and Malipo (90% of the total Zhuang population) counties (Johnson 2011a:43).

Names
Below are various names (both autonyms and exonyms) for the Nong Zhuang people (Johnson 2011a:43).
Pu Nong (濮侬)

Nongzu (侬族) or Nongren (侬人)
Long (龙)
Bu Tei
Bendi ( 'indigenous')

Subdivisions
Johnson (2011a) gives the following subdivisions for the Nong Zhuang peoples.

Dao Nong (道侬), or Nong Dau: Guangnan County
Niang Nong (仰侬), or Nong Nyeng; also called the "Green Nong" (青侬): along the Chouyang River (畴阳河) in Xichou and Malipo counties.
Du Nong (赌侬), or Nong Du: along the Duzhou River (赌咒河) in Maguan County.
Ting Nong (厅侬): along the Puting River (普厅河) in central Funing County (Xinghua 兴华, Banlun 板仑 and Guichao 皈朝 Townships)
Jin Nong (锦侬), or Nong Jing; also called the "Upper Nong" (上方侬): northeastern Wenshan County and Yanshan County.

A variety of Nong Zhuang known as Ao 傲 (autonym: Genluo 艮雒) is spoken by 58 people (as of 1960) in Banlun 板仑, Funing County (You 2013:291; Yunnan 1979).

Pyang Zhuang (or Fuping Zhuang 扶平壮), a Central Tai language variety closely related to Nong Zhuang, is spoken in Fuping Township 扶平乡, Debao County, Guangxi.

See also
Nung language (Tai) of Vietnam

References

 Johnson, Eric C. 2011a. "The Southern Zhuang Languages of Yunnan Province's Wenshan Prefecture from a Sociolinguistic Perspective." [Working paper]. S.l.: s.n. 49 pages.
 Johnson, Eric C. 2011b. "A Lexical and Phonological Comparison of the Central Taic Languages of Wenshan Prefecture, China: Getting More Out of Language Survey Wordlists Than Just Lexical Similarity Percentages." SIL Electronic Working Papers 2011-005: 170.

Tai languages